Cicerbita is a genus of flowering plants in the  family Asteraceae, native to Asia and Europe. They are known commonly as blue sow thistles. The word Cicerbita is from the Italian, meaning "chickory-like", a comparison to Cichorium, the chicory genus.

Description
Cicerbita are usually perennial plants, often with rhizomes. Annual species are also known. The leaves are undivided or pinnate. The flower head has 5 to 30 florets in shades of blue or purple, or occasionally white or yellow. The achene is ribbed and has a pappus of bristles and hairs.

Systematics
The plants of this genus were included in genus Lactuca, the lettuces, until 1822, when the first of them were separated based on the morphology of the fruits. The definition of the genus is still in debate and very unclear.

Accepted species
Kew accepts 42 Species (as of November 2022).
Some selected species;
 Cicerbita canadensis (L.) Farw. – eastern and central parts of Canada and USA
 Cicerbita chiangdaoensis H.Koyama – Thailand
 Cicerbita gmelini Beauverd – Altay Republic
 Cicerbita nepalensis Kitag. – Nepal
 Cicerbita nuristanica Kitam. – Afghanistan
 Cicerbita oligolepis Chang ex C.Shih – Yunnan
 Cicerbita thianschanica (Regel & Schmalh.) Beauverd – Altay Republic, Kazakhstan, Kyrgyzstan, Tajikistan, Uzbekistan, Xinjiang 
 Cicerbita unicostata Kitam. – Afghanistan
 Cicerbita violaefolia (Decne.) Beauverd – western Himalayas
 Cicerbita zeravschanica Popov ex Kovalevsk. – Kyrgyzstan, Tajikistan, Uzbekistan

Uses
Cicerbita alpina is eaten as a vegetable in Italy, part of its native range. The young shoots are boiled and served in olive oil or tomato sauce. They are considered a delicacy and can be had in restaurants. The shoots in oil can be purchased in markets under the local name insalata dell'orso ("bear salad"). The plant is collected from the wild and there is some concern that it may be threatened with overexploitation, so local ordinances now limit wild collection in some areas. Field trials are underway to examine the possibility of cultivating the plant in agriculture.

References

Cichorieae
Asteraceae genera
Taxa named by Karl Friedrich Wilhelm Wallroth